Jewels is another name for gemstones.

Jewels may also refer to:

Music
Jewels (Waylon Jennings album), 1968
Jewels (Einstürzende Neubauten album), 2007
"Jewels" (song), a 2007 song by the Japanese rock band Alice Nine

Other uses
Jewels (ballet), a 1967 American ballet by George Balanchine
Jewels (mixed martial arts), a Japanese mixed martial arts promotion focused on female fighters
Jewels (novel), by Danielle Steel
Jewels (miniseries), a 1992 NBC television miniseries based on the novel
Jewels (video), compilation album of English rock-band Queen
The Jewels, a girl group from Washington, D.C.
Three Jewels and Three Roots, a concept in Buddhism

See also
 Jewells (disambiguation)
 Jewel (disambiguation)
 Jewell (disambiguation)
 Jewellery
 Juelz